Bangor is an unincorporated community in Marshall County, Iowa, United States. It is located at the intersections of County Highway E18 and S62, five miles southwest of Liscomb and six miles south of Union. It is located near the west bank of the Iowa River, at 42.172838N, -93.089073W.

History
Bangor was founded by Abijah Hodgins in August 1854; it was a Quaker settlement, and according to one historian, the town "played a role in the Underground Railroad". Bangor's population was 52 in 1902, and 40 in 1925.

References

Unincorporated communities in Marshall County, Iowa
Unincorporated communities in Iowa
Populated places established in 1854
Populated places on the Underground Railroad
Underground Railroad in Iowa
1854 establishments in Iowa